Titanio normalis is a species of moth in the family Crambidae. It is found in Spain, Italy, Austria, the Czech Republic, Slovakia, Hungary, Croatia, Romania, Bulgaria, the Republic of Macedonia, Greece, Belarus, Russia and Turkey.

The larvae feed on Convolvulus species. They mine the leaves of their host plant. Young larvae create several small irregular, full depth blotch mines. Older larvae live in a dirt-covered silken tube that stretches from the ground up to a leaf. They mine the leaf from within this tube. Pupation takes place outside of the mine. Larvae can be found in September.

References

Moths described in 1796
Odontiini
Moths of Europe
Moths of Asia
Taxa named by Jacob Hübner